

Walther Graeßner (31 January 1891 – 16 July 1943) was a German general in the Wehrmacht during World War II who commanded the XII Army Corps. He was a recipient of the Knight's Cross of the Iron Cross. Graeßner was wounded in mid-February and later died of his wounds on 16 July 1943.

Awards and decorations

 Knight's Cross of the Iron Cross on 27 October 1941 as Generalleutnant and commander of 298. Infanterie-Division

References

Citations

Bibliography

 

1891 births
1943 deaths
Military personnel from Magdeburg
People from the Province of Saxony
German Army generals of World War II
Generals of Infantry (Wehrmacht)
German Army personnel of World War I
Recipients of the clasp to the Iron Cross, 1st class
Recipients of the Knight's Cross of the Iron Cross
German Army personnel killed in World War II
Reichswehr personnel